Brian Fekete (born January 26, 1990) is an American soccer player who played as a defender for Austin Aztex in USL Pro.

Career

College and amateur 
Fekete played his college soccer career at the University of Tampa from 2009 through 2012. He also played in the USL Premier Development League with Bradenton Academics in 2010 and GPS Portland Phoenix in 2011 and 2012. He was also a pick in the MLS Draft but wasn't selected for the team

Professional 
Fekete joined Orlando City in USL Pro as a trialist following the end of his 2012 collegiate season, and played in several of their preseason friendlies. He was signed to the team on March 1, 2013.

Fekete saw his first competitive action on May 14, 2013, when he started in Orlando City's third round match in the 2013 Lamar Hunt U.S. Open Cup against Ocala Stampede. He played his first league match on June 9, 2013, against Antigua Barracuda FC.

On March 3, 2014 Fekete announced on Twitter he will be playing for the Pittsburgh Riverhounds for the 2014 USL Pro season.

References

1990 births
Living people
American soccer players
Tampa Spartans men's soccer players
IMG Academy Bradenton players
GPS Portland Phoenix players
Orlando City SC (2010–2014) players
Pittsburgh Riverhounds SC players
Austin Aztex players
Soccer players from Florida
USL League Two players
USL Championship players
Sporting Kansas City draft picks
Sportspeople from Hillsborough County, Florida
Association football defenders
People from Plant City, Florida